Christopher Lee Hawk (February 16, 1951 – October 23, 2009) was an American surfer and board shaper.

Hawk was born in Maywood, California in 1951. During the 1980s, he became a surfboard shaper, and his boards were popular among locals in Orange County.

On September 18, Hawk was inducted into the Surfers' Hall of Fame in Huntington Beach. The induction normally takes place in July each year during the U.S. Open of Surfing, but Hawk's induction was moved forward because he had been diagnosed with terminal oral cancer. Just over a month after the induction, Hawk succumbed to the cancer and died on October 23 at his home in San Clemente.

References

American surfers
Surfboard shapers
1951 births
2009 deaths
Deaths from cancer in California
Deaths from oral cancer
People from Maywood, California
Sportspeople from Los Angeles County, California
Sportspeople from Orange County, California